Brushing boots or splint boots are used to protect a horse's legs during exercise, protecting the lower leg from injury that may occur if one leg or hoof strikes the opposite leg.  They are commonly seen on horses in fast work, such as  jumping, when in training, such as when longeing, or in competitions such as reining or eventing.  Brushing injuries are more common on the forelegs, when one hoof catches the other leg, or when the fetlock or cannon bones hit each other. This can cause a serious injury on a horse's legs, especially if the horse is wearing shoes.   Poor equine conformation can often lead to brushing, although even properly-conformed horses can also accidentally injure themselves.  Brushing boots may also be placed on horses in the field to protect them if they get overly excited.  Other reasons for use may include placement on a young or unfit horse which may be excitable and step on itself, or on horses subject to intense work that may stumble more if they are tired.

Materials and structure

Modern brushing boots are usually made of synthetic materials such as Neoprene or traditional materials such as leather.  They usually attach by a wide  velcro fastening which is pulled around the leg, although they can also be pushed through a ring and be fastened back upon themselves, making them more secure and less likely to slip during exercise. They can have between 1 and 5 straps, with front leg boots usually having more straps. Some boots may have buckles, especially older designs. They have a protective padded area on the side of the boot which is on the inside of the horses leg, protecting the cannon bone and fetlock. 

They are made in a wide variety of colors and of varying styles.

Fitting and use
The boot is usually placed onto the horse with the straps facing towards the rear on the outside of the leg, unless the attachment design mandates a different placement. To ensure there is even pressure around the leg when putting the boot on, they are fastened middle strap first, then the others.  Boots that are too tight can cause discomfort and pressure injuries, but those that are too loose may become dislodged or come off entirely. 

Incorrectly fitting boots will be uncomfortable for the horse and can cause rubbing and soreness, as well as impeding the horses movement. Sizing varies in different nations, but generally there are three to four size ranges for ponies, small or young horses, and large horses.

Brushing boots are not to be worn for long periods as they can become uncomfortable for the horse, especially if the boots get wet or dirty which may cause irritation and sores.

Care
Boots made of synthetic materials are generally machine-washable.  Leather boots are cleaned in the same manner as other leather horse tack, using saddle soap and similar products.  Boots that are washed need to be fully dry before storage or reuse.  Between uses, boots that are not washed are checked for accumulations of small stones or dirt which may irritate a horse's legs.

Brushing Boots
Q&A Brushing Boots
Choosing the Right Boot

Horse protective equipment